Lehman's Mill Historic District is a national historic district at Hagerstown, Washington County, Maryland, United States. The district comprises the remaining buildings of the mill group including the brick Lehman's Mill, built in 1869 for Henry F. Lehman, the farmstead with a stuccoed stone house dated 1837 with older and newer sections, a barn, carriage house, and agricultural outbuildings; another dwelling, also built by Lehman in 1877, a two-story brick and frame house; related outbuildings, and a portion of the mill's head and tail race. It is the oldest continuously operating mill in Washington County, and is the most intact mill complex remaining in the county.

It was added to the National Register of Historic Places in 1991.

References

External links
, including photo from 1990, at Maryland Historical Trust
Boundary Map of the Lehman's Mill Historic District, Washington County, at Maryland Historical Trust

Buildings and structures in Hagerstown, Maryland
Historic districts in Washington County, Maryland
Historic districts on the National Register of Historic Places in Maryland
Pennsylvania Dutch culture in Maryland
National Register of Historic Places in Washington County, Maryland